RoHS is the Restriction of Hazardous Substances Directive by the European Union.

ROHS may also refer to:

 Red Oak High School (Texas) in Red Oak, Texas, United States
 Royal Oak High School in Royal Oak, Michigan, United States
 China RoHS, the Chinese version of the above Restriction of Hazardous Substances Directive.